Karim Munch (born February 15, 1989) is an Egyptian professional footballer who currently plays as an attacking midfielder for the Egyptian club El Raja SC.

References

1989 births
Living people
El Raja SC players
Egyptian footballers
Association football midfielders
Asyut Petroleum SC players
Al Ittihad Alexandria Club players
Aswan SC players